Aderman is a surname. Notable people with the surname include:

 Ernest Aderman (1894–1968), New Zealand politician
 Sven Åderman, Swedish inventor and military officer

See also 
Adermann

References